{{Infobox station
| style = Amtrak
| style2 = Amtrak old
| name = Tempe, AZ
| image = Tempe-Tempe Depot-1924.jpg
| address = 3rd Street and Ash Avenue
| borough = Tempe, Arizona
| country = United States
| coordinates = 
| owned = City of Tempe
| line = UP Phoenix Subdivision
| code = 
| opened = 1924
| rebuilt = 1987
| closed = June 3, 1996
| connections = 
| other_services_header = Former services
| other_services = {{Adjacent stations|system1=Amtrak
|line1=Sunset Limited|note-mid1=Until 1996 reroute|left1=Phoenix|right1=Tucson|to-right1=Miami
|line2=Texas Eagle|note-mid2=Until 1996 reroute|left2=Phoenix|right2=Tucson|to-left2=Los Angeles}}
}}

Tempe station is a former train station in Tempe, Arizona. Previously, Amtrak's Sunset Limited and Texas Eagle trains stopped at the station, but they were shifted to a more southerly route in June 1996. However, an Amtrak Thruway shuttle route connects the station to the Maricopa station on the new routing.

 History 
The Southern Pacific Railroad built the depot in 1924.

The city of Tempe purchased the building in 1987 and renovated it. The station was served by Amtrak's Sunset Limited and Texas Eagle'' from 1987 until June 3, 1996, when Amtrak was forced to re-route the trains due to deteriorated track conditions on the secondary Union Pacific Railroad line which diverged from the mainline to serve Phoenix and Tempe. Amtrak opened the Maricopa station to serve Phoenix, Tempe and the greater Central Arizona area. After Amtrak left the station, Macayo's Depot Cantina, a Mexican restaurant, was built on the site, but the historic train depot was untouched.

On May 1, 2017, Amtrak started a new Amtrak Thruway shuttle service (operated by Stagecoach Express) connecting Tempe station and Phoenix Sky Harbor International Airport to Maricopa station.

In the early 2000s, the area saw the construction of several new rail lines. In 2008, the Valley Metro Rail line opened with light rail trains running parallel to the Union Pacific tracks, and curving east onto 3rd Avenue just north of the historic train depot. In Spring 2022, the Tempe Streetcar is expected to open, with southbound cars passing right by the station site.

In January 2021, the city of Tempe approved a plan to redevelop the station site into a mixed-use development, which also will preserve and restore the train depot on the site. The development will include two towers: a 17-story office tower and a 18-story Hilton-branded hotel tower. The two towers will connect with a bridge over the light rail tracks.

See also
 Mill Avenue Bridges

References

External links 

  Former Tempe Southern Pacific & Amtrak Station (USA RailGuide – TrainWeb)

Amtrak
Former Amtrak stations in Arizona
Railway stations in the United States opened in 1924
Railway stations closed in 1996
1924 establishments in Arizona
1996 disestablishments in Arizona
Transportation in Maricopa County, Arizona
Former Southern Pacific Railroad stations
Railway stations on the National Register of Historic Places in Arizona
National Register of Historic Places in Maricopa County, Arizona